The R238 road is a regional road in Ireland. It is a ring road around the Inishowen Peninsula in County Donegal. The R238 is also part of the main road from Derry to Buncrana. Sections of the road form part of the Wild Atlantic Way. In July 2010, the road was the site of Ireland's worst road crash resulting in eight deaths.

The R238 travels north from the N13 at Bridge End. The road travels along Lough Swilly to reach Buncrana. From there the road proceeds inland to Carndonagh. After Carndonagh, the road goes to meet the Lough Foyle coast at Moville. From Moville the road proceeds southwest to end at the County Londonderry border just past Muff.

See also
Roads in Ireland
July 2010 R238 traffic collision

References

Regional roads in the Republic of Ireland
Roads in County Donegal